Brierfield is an unincorporated community in Bibb County, Alabama, United States.  It was established in the mid 19th century and was the site of a major ironworks operation during and following the American Civil War.  It is thought by scholars to be named in honor of Jefferson Davis' Brierfield Plantation, which supplied the first ironworks with machinery.  It has two sites listed on the National Register of Historic Places, the Brierfield Furnace and Montebrier.

Geography

References

Unincorporated communities in Alabama
Unincorporated communities in Bibb County, Alabama